Jee may refer to:

People
 Joe Jee (1883–1919), English football player
 Joseph Jee (1819–1899), English surgeon
 Martha Jee, also known as Martha Wong (1939–), Texas politician
 Rupert Jee (born 1956), American entrepreneur and television celebrity

Other
 -jee or -ji, Indian honorific
 jee, the ISO 639 code for Jerung language
 Jee or Ji (Korean name), popular element in many two-syllable Korean given names
 JEE or Joint Entrance Examination, Indian engineering academic exam
 JEE, the IATA code of Jérémie Airport, Haiti
 Jee-PC 400S, variant of the Skytone Alpha-400 computer
 SS Ben Jee, coastal cargo vessel